The following is a list of the prominent bays in the islands of the Azores:

Corvo
 Bay of Porto da Casa

Faial

 Bay of Areia da Quinta
 Bay of Ribeira das Cabras
 Bay of Varadouro
 Bay of Horta
 Bay of Porto Pim

Flores

 Bay of Lajes
 Bay of Alagoa

Graciosa

 Bay of Poça
 Bay of Engrade 
 Bay of Lagoa
 Bay of Caldeirinha
 Bay of Filipe
 Bay of Folga
 Bay of Quarteiro
 Bay of Ponta da Barca
 Bay of Barra
 Bay of Santo António

Pico

 Bay of Pedrinhas
 Bay of Água Velha
 Bay of Calhau Miúdo
 Bay of Ferro
 Bay of Domingos Pereira
 Bay of Fonte
 Bay of Caravela
 Bay of Céu de Abraão
 Bay of Engrade
 Bay of Calhau
 Bay of Canus
 Bay of Cachorro
 Bay of Barca
 Bay of Lajes do Pico
 Bay of Canas

Santa Maria

 Bay of Anjos
 Bay of Cré
 Bay of Raposa
 Bay of Tagarete
 Bay of São Lourenço
 Bay of Cura
 Bay of Praia
 Bay of Maia

São Jorge

 Bay of Velas
 Bay of Areia
 Bay of Entre Morros
 Bay of Arrais
 Bay of Senhora do Rosário
 Bay of Calheta

São Miguel

 Bay of Santa Iria
 Bay of Água

Terceira

 Bay of Angra
 Bay of Tumba
 Bay of Mós
 Bay of Biscoitos
 Bay of Vila
 Bay of Villa Maria
 Bay of Praia da Vitória
 Bay of Angra do Heroísmo
 Bay of Salga
 Bay of Salgueiros
 Bay of Porto Judeu
 Bay of Fanal
 Bay of Contendas
 Bay of Refugo
 Bay of Zimbral
 Bay of Quatro Ribeiras
 Bay of Canas
 Bay of Negrito
 Bay of Agualva
 Bay of Pombas

See also
 List of fajãs in the Azores

References
 
 
 
 

bays
 *
bays
Azores
Bays